DigiDrummer was a music video game made and published by Magnick Software for iOS. It was developed by Nicholas Rudolfsky and Magnus Larsson. DigiDrummer received its last update on October 27, 2009 in the form of version 3.9. It is no longer available on Apple's App Store. having .

Reception
DigiDrummer reached the top 7 in December 2009 on Apple's App Store. It won the iPhone Excellence Award in 2008.

See also
List of iPhone OS games

External links
Magnick Software

References

2008 video games
Drumming video games
IOS games
IOS-only games
Video games developed in the United States